English coast may refer to:
 the coast of England; see Coastline of the United Kingdom
 English Coast (Antarctica), the portion of the coast of Antarctica between the northern tip of Rydberg Peninsula and Buttress Nunataks